Asha Menon may refer to:

 Asha Menon (judge) (born 1960), judge of the Delhi High Court
 Asha Menon (writer) (born 1947), Indian writer and reviewer of Malayalam literature
 Asha G. Menon (born 1985), Indian Malayalam film playback singer